Neil Sedaka: Italiano Volume 2 is a 1965 compilation containing a second set of Italian-language recordings by the American pop star Neil Sedaka. It was released on RCA Victor's Italiana label in Italy.

Track listing

Side 1
1) "La Notte E' Fatta Per Amare" ("Another Day, Another Heartache")
2) "Sara' Sara'"
3) "Viene La Notte"
4) "Mai Sara' Come Te" ("She'll Never Be You")
5) "Ricordati Ancora"
6) "Matto" ("The Dreamer")

Side 2
7) "Non Basta Mai"
8) "I Primi Giorni" ("Bad Girl")
9) "La Luna A Fiori"
10) "Darei 10 Anni"
11) "La Forza Del Destino"
12) "Che Non Farei" ("I Hope He Breaks Your Heart")

CD re-issue
In 1993, Casa Nostra Records reissued this album, along with the tracks from "Neil Sedaka: Italiano", as a combo album.

References

1965 compilation albums
Neil Sedaka compilation albums
RCA Victor compilation albums